Shadman Islam Anik (born 18 May 1995) is a Bangladeshi international cricketer. He made his Test debut for the Bangladesh cricket team in November 2018.

Domestic career
In May 2017, Shadman scored his first List A century, playing for Abahani Limited in the 2016–17 Dhaka Premier Division Cricket League.

Shadman was the leading run-scorer for Central Zone in the 2017–18 Bangladesh Cricket League, with 500 runs in six matches. In October 2018, he was named in the squad for the Chittagong Vikings team, following the draft for the 2018–19 Bangladesh Premier League. He was also the leading run-scorer in the 2018–19 National Cricket League, with 648 runs in six matches.

Shadman was the leading run-scorer for Shinepukur Cricket Club in the 2018–19 Dhaka Premier Division Cricket League tournament, with 379 runs in 8 matches. In August 2019, he was one of 35 cricketers named in a training camp ahead of Bangladesh's 2019–20 season.

International career
In November 2018, Shadman was added to Bangladesh's Test squad for the series against the West Indies. He made his Test debut for Bangladesh against the West Indies on 30 November 2018. In July 2021, in the one-off match against Zimbabwe, Shadman scored his maiden century in Test cricket, with an unbeaten 115 runs in the second innings.

Personal life
Shadman married Nasha Walid in July 2020 during the coronavirus pandemic. Nasha was a student of CSE in North South University during their marriage. Shadman announced his marriage through Facebook when he changed his relationship status to 'married'.

References

External links
 

1995 births
Living people
Bangladeshi cricketers
Bangladesh Test cricketers
Cricketers from Dhaka
Dhaka Metropolis cricketers
Kala Bagan Krira Chakra cricketers
Dhaka Dominators cricketers
Chattogram Challengers cricketers
Bangladesh East Zone cricketers
Abahani Limited cricketers
Shinepukur Cricket Club cricketers